Hubert E. Buchanan (born April 24, 1941) is a former United States Air Force captain and fighter pilot in the Vietnam War who was shot down, captured, and spent 2,362 days as a prisoner of war in Hanoi and surrounding areas. He was one of the first American POWs to return to Vietnam after the war, and visited the man credited with his capture.

Early life 
Buchanan was born in Scottsburg, Indiana, to Mary and Hubert Buchanan. He graduated from Duquesne University in Pittsburgh, Pennsylvania.

Military service 
Buchanan entered Officer Training School on February 14, 1964, earning his commission as a second lieutenant in the U.S. Air Force at Lackland Air Force Base, Texas, on May 12, 1964. Buchanan next attended Undergraduate Pilot Training and was awarded his pilot wings at Laredo Air Force Base, Texas, in June 1965, followed by Pilot Systems Operator Training and F-4 Phantom II Combat Crew Training from June to December 1965. His next assignment was as an F-4 Pilot Systems Operator with the 16th Tactical Fighter Squadron at Eglin Air Force Base, Florida, from December 1965 to August 1966, followed by service as an F-4 Pilot Systems Operator with the 555th Tactical Fighter Squadron at Ubon Royal Thai Air Force Base, Thailand, from August 1966.

Dogfight and Ejection 

On 16 September 1966, Major John L. "Robbie" Robertson, pilot, and then-First Lieutenant Buchanan, weapons systems operator, comprised the crew of the #3 aircraft (F-4C-20-MC, s/n 63-7643) in a flight of four, call sign "Moonglow 3". This was Major Robertson's 29th day in Southeast Asia and 1st Lt. Buchanan's 17th mission. Shortly after the flight departed Ubon, one of the Phantoms developed fuel problems and was forced to return to base. The rest of the flight continued with their mission.

At 15:40, Moonglow flight was nearing their target when they were engaged in aerial combat by a flight of four MiG-17s. The Phantoms jettisoned their external ordinance before engaging the enemy fighters. As the dogfight progressed, Roscoe Epperson, a good friend of Major Robertson who was flying an air cover for another mission, recognized Robbie Robertson's voice over the radio and listened to the transmissions of the air battle. He heard Major Robertson state, "This is Moonglow 3, I see the MiGs. I am engaging MiGs!" He heard the entire battle from sighting the enemy aircraft through the dogfight. He also heard his friend report, "I am hit, and I'm heading for the water!" In the chaos of battle, no parachutes were seen and no emergency radio beepers were heard. Because of the location being deep within enemy-held territory, no search and rescue (SAR) operation was possible. At the time of loss both Robbie Robertson and Hugh Buchanan were listed missing in action.

Moonglow flight had been jumped by a flight of four MiG-17s that launched from Gia Lam Air Base on the northeast edge of Hanoi. The #3 MiG was flown by North Vietnamese ace Nguyễn Văn Bảy, who was credited with seven kills by the end of the war. In a 1997 meeting between the North Vietnamese pilot and Ralph Wetterhahn, another friend of Robbie Robertson who was also assigned to this strike mission and flying in another flight of F4C aircraft from the 555 TFS, the following information was established. The MiGs were scrambled early in the afternoon. Nguyen Van Bay was the first one to spot the American flight far ahead of them. He asked permission to attack the Phantoms. The MiG's flight leader gave permission to give chase, but expressed doubt that they could catch the much faster American aircraft. As the MiG-17s moved toward the Phantoms, Nguyễn Văn Bảy saw Moonglow 3 initiate a climbing left turn. Nguyễn Văn Bảy aimed, then fired his 37mm and 23mm cannons at the Phantom.

Buchanan reported to Robertson, "This guy's pulling right in on us. He's going to shoot any time now." At that moment a salvo of orange golf ball-size rounds passed over Moonglow 3's canopies. Robbie Robertson pulled hard on the stick, then eased his turn. Hugh Buchanan saw the MiG close again. He said, "This is going to be it. He's corrected the problem."

Nguyễn Văn Bảy lined up, fired again and saw a wheel come out from beneath the F4's wing and sail past his canopy. For 1st Lt. Buchanan everything went black. According to the WSO, "It could have been from so many G forces pulling the blood away from my eyes, I'm not sure. My helmet was bouncing around - I really don't have a clear memory of ejecting, however, I do sort of have a dream - I can kind of imagine pulling the handle the F4 had between your legs." He went on to say, "I also ejected so I must have done it. I could hear loud booms, like the canopy blowing off. And I felt the wind. The next thing I knew, my parachute was opening. When I got down low, I could see people running around on the ground in a little village. I could see a guy off to the right. He looked like he had a uniform on and a rifle and he was running in my direction."

Nguyễn Văn Bảy sped away from the burning Phantom, then rolled back to take a look. He watched the aircraft pitch down in flames. He made a note of seeing one parachute as he turned his attention to the remaining US aircraft. Later that day, the Foreign Broadcast Information Service in Okinawa translated a Hanoi broadcast that announced the downing of two US aircraft in the area where Moonglow 3 was lost. About a month later, Radio Hanoi announced the names of three captured Americans, one of whom was Hubert Buchanan. At that time Buchanan's status was updated from "Missing in Action" to Prisoner of War.

Capture
Buchanan ejected over the Red River Delta and landed in a small village where approximately 100 villagers awaited and quickly disarmed him. While some villagers were armed with rifles and machetes, most were unarmed and even fetched Buchanan drinking water. A farmer named Le Cong Su was officially credited by the North Vietnamese government for Buchanan's capture. After hours of holding Buchanan in the village, a political officer arrived to collect Buchanan from the villagers. The political officer roused the crowd to become angry and paraded Buchanan around through many villages encouraging people to be violent with him, some tried to kill him.

After several hours, Buchanan was taken to Hanoi's Hỏa Lò Prison also known as the "Hanoi Hilton."

Prisoner of War 
Upon arrival at the prison camp, Buchanan was taken into interrogation where political officers attempted to solicit classified information regarding future air strike targets. Interrogators used torture to extract information, but Buchanan resisted. He later remarked that his initial interrogation was remarkably similar to conditions for which he was prepared in the Air Force SERE program.

Initially, Buchanan was regularly subjected to various forms of torture and beatings in attempts to elicit military secrets. Buchanan spent the first six months of captivity in solitary confinement.

Buchanan was later awarded the Silver Star (second award), Legion of Merit, and Bronze Star medals for resisting the demands of his captors in the face of "harassment, intimidation, crulties... and torture"

Post-war return to Vietnam  

In December 1991, Japanese television company Mirai, USA offered to send Buchanan back to Vietnam as part of an ongoing series about MIAs.

References 

Vietnam War prisoners of war
United States Air Force officers
1941 births
Living people
Commercial aviators
Shot-down aviators
Military personnel missing in action
United States Air Force personnel of the Vietnam War
American Vietnam War bomber pilots